Frontier Junior-Senior High School is a public high school located in Chalmers, Indiana.

Athletics
Frontier Junior-Senior High School's athletic teams are the Falcons and they compete in the Hoosier Heartland Conference. The school offers a wide range of athletics including:

Baseball
Basketball (Men's and Women's)
Cross Country (Men's and Women's)
Football
Golf (Men's and Women's)
Softball
Track and Field (Men's and Women's)
Volleyball
Wrestling

See also
 List of high schools in Indiana

References

External links
 Official Website

Schools in White County, Indiana
Public high schools in Indiana
Public middle schools in Indiana